Kunnukara is a census town and panchayat in Paravur Taluk of Ernakulam district, Kerala, India. The village is situated on the airport road connecting North Paravur (NH66) and Nedumbassery (NH544). North Paravur is the nearest town, 7 km from this village. Aluva (10 km) and Angamaly (12 km) are also near to Kunnukara. Its administrative headquarters is in Kunnukara Town itself. The Mini Civil Station has four hospitals, all the Govt. offices, a Khadi Unit Supermarkets etc.

History
Kunnukara panchayat was once part of Ayroor village union in Alengad taluk, later Alengad merged with N.Paravur and Kunnukara became panchayat. This place was under Kingdom of Cochin. During Mysorean invasion of Kerala, Tipu Sultan travelled through Manjaly via Kunnukara.

Geography
Kunnukara is surrounded by Periyar river in south, Chalakudy river in north and Manjaly Canal in its centre and west, Kunnukara is the part of Kerala backwaters. The surrounding areas are Chengamand panchayat in east, Thrissur district - Kuzhur panchayat in North, Puthenvelikkara panchayat in west and Karumallore panchayat to the south. Kunnukara is considered to be the rice grain of Paravur. The main source of income in the panchayat comes from agriculture. Different types of cultivations are there in the panchayat. Brick construction is a major industry in the panchayat.

Civic Administration
Kunnukara belongs to Parakkadav block panchayat. These are the wards or places in Kunnukara: Aduvassery, Kuttipuzha, Chalakka, Ayroor, Vayalkara, Kuthiathode.

Transport
There are frequent buses passing through Kunnukara. Ferry services are available from different parts of Kunnukara to reach nearby places like Karumalloor, Kuzhur. The government is planning to introduce an inland water service through Periyar, passing through Kunnukara.

Nearest Railway Stations
Aluva Railway Station
Angamaly Railway Station
Chowwara Railway Station

Nearest Airports
Cochin International Airport

Public Institutions
 MES College of Engineering and Technology, Kunnukara
 Sree Narayana Institute of Medical Sciences (SNIMS), Chalakka, Kunnukara
 Ryan International school
 MES central school(Closed)
 Saraswathy Vidyanikethan high school
 MES TO Abdulla memorial College. Kunnukara
 Government JBS, Kunnukara
 Christ Raj High School Kuttipuzha, Kunnukara

Recent Infrastructural Developments
Two new bridges namely Thadikkakadavu Bridge and Purappilikavu Regulator Bridge have been remarkable achievements in the recent past for Kunnukara Panchayath. These bridges are set to reduce the travel time of commuters to Aluva.

Places of worship

Major Churches in Kunnukara
 Ayroor St. Anthony's Catholic church (estd. 1928)
 Kuttipuzha St. Sebastian's Roman Catholic church
 Kuthiathode St. Francis Church
 Kuthiathode St. Thomas Old Church (1301)
 Kuthiathode St. George Chapel
 Kunnukara-Kuttipuzha Chapel
 North Aduvassery Chapel

Major Temples in Kunnukara
 Durga Bhagavathy Temple, Ayroor
 Aduvassery Vasudevapuram temple
 Kalarikkal Bhagavathy Kshetram, Vayalkara
 Navalloor Shiva Kshetram, Kuttipuzha
 Sree Koottala Bhagavathy Kshethram, Kunnukara.*
 Sree Shastha Kshethram, Kunnukara.
 Kovat Bhagavathy temple, Kuttipuzha
 Thiruvambadi Manikyathrikovil Kshetram, Kunnukara.
 Akathoott Devi Kshethram, Kuttipuzha
 Akathoot krishna kshethram, Kuttipuzh'''a
 Mankkal krishna kshethram, Kuttipuzha
 Uzhathukavu Bhagavathi temple, N.Aduvasserry
 Ayroor Pisharikkal Sree Durga Temple
 Sree Parthasaradhy Kshetram, Attupuram
 Thellathuruthu-Chalakka Kaduvakavu Bhagavathy Kshethram

Mosques
 Kunnukara Juma Masjid
 Aduvassery Mosque, Thadikkal Kadavu
 Vayalkara East Juma Masjid 
 Vayalkara West Ihyaul Islam Juma Masjid
 Chalakkal Juma Masjid

Schools
 Christ Raj High School, Kunnukara
 St. Thomas Higher Secondary School Ayroor
 Saraswathi Vidyaniketan, Vayalkara
 MES public school, Kunnukara (closed)
 Ryan International School
 JBS Kunnukara, Kuttipuzha
 St. Francis L P school, Kuttipuzha
 St. Arnold Residential CBSE School, N.Aduvassery
 St.Joseph L.P School Ayroor
 St. Antony's L.P School Ayroor
 Govt L P School vayalkara
 Ryan International School, Kunnukara

See also
 Paravur Taluk
 Kochi
 Ernakulam District

External links

Cities and towns in Ernakulam district
Suburbs of Kochi